Metasia achroa is a species of moth of the family Crambidae described by Oswald Bertram Lower in 1903. It is known from Australia.

References

Moths described in 1903
Metasia